Max Wenden Abbott  is a New Zealand psychologist. He is the co-director and founder of the National Institute for Public Health and Mental Health Research.

Career 
Abbott was the first person ever to be appointed national director of the Mental Health Foundation, a position he took up in 1981. He was also President of the World Federation for Mental Health. Abbott resigned as the AUT's Dean of the Faculty of Health and Environmental Sciences Professor in 1991 and was a Pro-Vice-Chancellor of Auckland University of Technology (AUT), and a worldwide leader in the field of gambling addiction.

In the 2016 New Year Honours, Abbott was appointed a Companion of the New Zealand Order of Merit, for services to health, science and education. He is also a recipient of AUT’s University Medal.

Controversy 
A five-page complaint was laid against Abbott in August 2019 for sexual harassment. In 2020 an investigation was conducted into allegations of sexual harassment of an overseas colleague. The harassment took place over two years. Professor Max Abbott resigned from AUT in the wake of the claims. He has now apologised to the female academic.

References

People educated at Kuranui College
Companions of the New Zealand Order of Merit
New Zealand psychologists
Academic staff of the Auckland University of Technology
Year of birth missing (living people)
Living people
Sexual harassment